Neoennearthron is a genus of tree-fungus beetles in the family Ciidae.

Species
 Neoennearthron bicarinatum Miyatake, 1954
 Neoennearthron hisamatsui Miyatake, 1959

References

Ciidae genera